Barnstorf is a municipality in the district of Diepholz, in Lower Saxony, Germany. It is situated approximately 15 km northeast of Diepholz.

Barnstorf is home to the football club Barnstorfer SV.

Barnstorf is also the seat of the Samtgemeinde ("collective municipality") Barnstorf.

References

Diepholz (district)